Glogova may refer to:

Glogova, Bratunac, Bosnia and Herzegovina
Glogova (Višegrad), Bosnia and Herzegovina
Glogova, Gorj, Romania

See also
Glogovac (disambiguation)